Air Force is a male professional volleyball team based in Chonburi, Thailand. The club was founded in 2010 and plays in the Volleyball Thailand League.

Current squad
The club is windraw in Thailand League at 2016

Honours
Domestic competitions
Thailand League :
  Champion (2): 2010–11,2011–12
  Runner-up (3): 2009–2010, 2013–14, 2014–15
 Third (2): 2012–13, 2015–16
 Thai-Denmark Super League :
  Champion (2): 2014, 2015
  Runner-up (1): 2016
International competitions
 Asian Club Championship 2 appearances 
 2012 — 5
 2011 — 5

Notable players

Domestic Players

  Prasit Piladuang
  Teerasak Nakprasong
  Yossapon Wattana
  Kittikun Sriutthawong
  Kon Nanboon
  Pisanu Harnkhomtun
  Jirayu Raksakaew
  Kissada Nilsawai
  Puvapol Sopapol
  Saranchit Charoensuk
  Kantapat Koonmee
  Arnon Jaithaisong
  Kitisak Saengsee
  Mawin Maneewong
  Anuchit Pakdeekaew 
  Artit Kaewaonsai
  Piyarat Toontupthai
  Pusit Phonarin
  Khanit Sinlapasorn
  Chatmongkol Pragadkaew
  Nattapong Kesapan
  Pollawat Nitkhamhan

Foreigner Players

  Kyaw Kyaw Htway
  Aung Thu
  Pablo Fenandu

References

Volleyball clubs in Thailand
Men's volleyball teams